There are at least 109 named lakes and reservoirs in Arkansas County, Arkansas.

Lakes
 Bark Shanty Lake, el. 
 Bay Bayou, el. 
 Bear Lake, el. 
 Bear Pond, el. 
 Benson Lake, el. 
 Big Horseshoe Lake, el. 
 Big White Lake, el. 
 Black Lake, el. 
 Brooks Lake, el. 
 Brushy Lake, el. 
 Brushy Lake, el. 
 Burnt Lake, el. 
 Cocklebur Lakes, el. 
 Columbus Lake, el. 
 Cooks Lake, el. 
 Covington Lake, el. 
 Cox Cypress Lake, el. 
 Crane Lake, el. 
 Crockett Lake, el. 
 Ditch Lake, el. 
 Drainie Lake, el. 
 Dry Lake, el. 
 Eagle Nest Lake, el. 
 Escronges Lake, el. 
 Fish Lake, el. 
 Flag Lake, el. 
 Flat Lake, el. 
 Flat Lake, el. 
 Fraizer Lake, el. 
 Glenwood Lake, el. 
 Goose Lake, el. 
 Goosefoot Lake, el. 
 Gordon Lake, el. 
 Grand Cypress Lake, el. 
 Grassy Lake, el. 
 Gum Pond, el. 
 Gut Lake, el. 
 H Lake, el. 
 Hole in the Wall, el. 
 Holly Lake, el. 
 John Smith Lake, el. 
 La Grue Lake, el. 
 Laboring Bay, el. 
 Lake Dumond, el. 
 Leak Lake, el. 
 Lemmons Lake, el. 
 Little Goose Lake, el. 
 Little H Lake, el. 
 Little Horseshoe Lake, el. 
 Little Jones Lake, el. 
 Little Lake, el. 
 Little Pecan Lake, el. 
 Little Round Pond, el. 
 Little White Lake, el. 
 Long Lake, el. 
 Long Lake, el. 
 Long Lake, el. 
 Long Lake, el. 
 Lost Lake, el. 
 Lower Eagle Nest Lake, el. 
 Lower White Lake, el. 
 Luckett Lake, el. 
 Merrisach Lake, el. 
 Mobley Lake, el. 
 Moody Old River, el. 
 Moon Lakes, el. 
 Mopkins Lake, el. 
 Mud Lake, el. 
 Mud Lake, el. 
 Mud Lake, el. 
 Mud Lakes, el. 
 Old Old River, el. 
 Old River Lake, el. 
 Otter Lake, el. 
 Owens Lake, el. 
 Oxbow Lake, el. 
 Park Lake, el. 
 Polecat Lakes, el. 
 Poplar Creek Lake, el. 
 Prairie Lake, el. 
 Price's Lake, el. 
 Prosperous Bayou, el. 
 Round Lake, el. 
 Round Lake, el. 
 Star Lake, el. 
 T Lake, el. 
 Tupelo Lake, el. 
 Turner Lake, el. 
 Twin Lakes, el. 
 Twin Lakes, el. 
 Wheeler Lake, el. 
 White Lake, el. 
 Willow Lake, el. 
 Wolf Lake, el.

Reservoirs
 Abernathy Reservoir, el. 
 Alter Lake, el. 
 Alter Lake Number Two, el. 
 Arkansas Post Canal Reservoir, el. 
 Baker Brothers Reservoir, el. 
 Bennett Reservoir, el. 
 Botts Lake, el. 
 Bradberry Pond, el. 
 Brother Reservoir, el. 
 Butler Lake, el. 
 Butler Lake Number Two, el. 
 Chaney Lake, el. 
 Childers Lake Dam, el. 
 Cox Reservoir, el. 
 Daugherty Reservoir, el.

See also
 List of lakes in Arkansas

Notes

Bodies of water of Arkansas County, Arkansas
Arkansas